The NWA Southeastern Heavyweight Championship (Northern Division) was a major title in the NWA's Alabama territory known as Southeastern Championship Wrestling. It existed from 1972 until 1988 when the promotion became the Continental Wrestling Federation. This title had two divisions of it, the "Northern Division" and the "Southern Division", with the Northern Division being the predominant one. The Southern Division was the continuation of the NWA Gulf Coast Heavyweight Championship. Please see that title history for the Southern Division title history.

Title history

See also 
 List of National Wrestling Alliance championships
 Southeast Championship Wrestling
 Gulf Coast Championship Wrestling

References 

National Wrestling Alliance championships
Continental Championship Wrestling championships
United States regional professional wrestling championships
Heavyweight wrestling championships